

Seeds

Qualifiers

Lucky losers
  Vanessa Henke /  Bryanne Stewart

Draw

First qualifier

Second qualifier

Third qualifier

Fourth qualifier

External links
 Official Results Archive (WTA)
2001 US Open – Women's draws and results at the International Tennis Federation

2001 US Open (tennis)
2001 US Open – Women's Doubles Qualifying
US Open (tennis) by year – Qualifying